In algebra, the factor theorem is a theorem linking factors and zeros of a polynomial. It is a special case of the polynomial remainder theorem.

The factor theorem states that a polynomial  has a factor  if and only if  (i.e.  is a root).

Factorization of polynomials

Two problems where the factor theorem is commonly applied are those of factoring a polynomial and finding the roots of a polynomial equation; it is a direct consequence of the theorem that these problems are essentially equivalent.

The factor theorem is also used to remove known zeros from a polynomial while leaving all unknown zeros intact, thus producing a lower degree polynomial whose zeros may be easier to find. Abstractly, the method is as follows:
 Deduce the candidate of zero  of the polynomial  from its leading coefficient  and constant term . (See Rational Root Theorem.)
 Compute the polynomial , for example using polynomial long division or synthetic division.

Example
Find the factors of 

Solution: Let  be the above polynomial
Constant term = 2 
 Coefficient of 
Substituting , we get: 

 Quotient = 
Hence, 

References

 
Theorems about polynomials